The Amin's house is a historical house in Isfahan, Iran. This beautiful house belongs to the Qajar era. During the time of expansion and development of the city the house lost its yard and at the present time its veranda faces the street. There are many beautiful decorations such as stucco, mirror decorations and marquetry doors in the house.

See also
List of the historical structures in the Isfahan province

References 

Houses in Iran
Buildings and structures in Isfahan